Catarroja Club de Fútbol is a Spanish football team based in Catarroja, in the autonomous community of Valencia. Founded in 1924 it plays in Tercera División – Group 6, holding home games at Estadio Mundial 82, with a capacity of 5,000 seats.

Season to season

28 seasons in Tercera División

External links
Futbolme team profile 

Football clubs in the Valencian Community
Association football clubs established in 1924
1924 establishments in Spain